Ormiophasia is a genus of parasitic flies in the family Tachinidae. There are about 17 described species in Ormiophasia.

Species
These 17 species belong to the genus Ormiophasia:

 Ormiophasia buoculus Gudin & Nihei, 2019
 Ormiophasia busckii Townsend, 1919
 Ormiophasia causeyi Tavares, 1964
 Ormiophasia chapulini Gudin & Nihei, 2019
 Ormiophasia costalimai Tavares, 1964
 Ormiophasia crassivena Gudin & Nihei, 2019
 Ormiophasia cruzi Tavares, 1964
 Ormiophasia guimaraesi Gudin & Nihei, 2019
 Ormiophasia inflata (Seguy, 1927)
 Ormiophasia lanei Tavares, 1964
 Ormiophasia manguinhos Gudin & Nihei, 2019
 Ormiophasia morardi (Seguy, 1926)
 Ormiophasia obscura (Seguy, 1926)
 Ormiophasia seguyi Gudin & Nihei, 2019
 Ormiophasia tavaresi Gudin & Nihei, 2019
 Ormiophasia tavassosi Tavares, 1964
 Ormiophasia townsendi Gudin & Nihei, 2019

References

Further reading

 
 
 
 

Tachinidae
Articles created by Qbugbot